Mahshahr Airport  is an airport in Mahshahr, Iran.

Airlines and destinations

Accidents and incidents
On 27 January 2020, Caspian Airlines Flight 6936 overran the runway on landing. All on board survived.

References

Airports in Iran
Buildings and structures in Khuzestan Province
Transportation in Khuzestan Province